Thalía is a compilation album by Mexican singer Thalía, and fourth eponymous album released on 9 December 2013, by Sony Music. The album was released exclusively in Brazil. The album is a collection that contains her greatest hits since joining Sony Music, as well as four songs sung by Thalía exclusively in Portuguese. The album's lead single "Estou Apaixonado" had radio airplay success entering the charts in Brazil and featured Brazilian singer Daniel.

Background and production
The album brings together songs from the albums Primera Fila and Habítame Siempre and Portuguese versions of four songs from these two albums: "Manías", "Equivocada", "Beijame" and "Estou Apaixonado", which she performs in a duet with Brazilian country music singer Daniel. This was the first time since 1997 that Thalía recorded music in Portuguese, this time with hopes to extend her Viva Tour to Brazil, a country that she hadn't visited since 2000. According to the singer, the duet with singer Michael Bublé on the song "Bésame Mucho" was immersed in the rhythm of bossa nova, one of the singer's favorite Brazilian musical styles. The singer showed the album cover on her Instagram page on the night of November 21, 2013. To promote the album, a music video was made for the song "Estou Apaixonado" (translation: I'm in Love") with Daniel, the singers recorded the video separately in the studio and then the images were merged, it was released in 14 March 2014.

Track listing
Source:

Release history

References

 

Thalía albums
2013 compilation albums